Chuck Patterson (February 11, 1945 – December 23, 2013) was an American actor and director, whose career spanned more than three decades.

Early life

Born in Memphis, Tennessee.

Career
Patterson began his acting career in 1972 and appeared in film, television and stage roles.

Personal life
Patterson was married twice. His second wife was playwright Cori Thomas. He had a stepdaughter, Natasha Newman.

He died December 23, 2013, aged 68, of a heart attack. He lived in the Harlem neighborhood of New York City, New York, at the time of his death.

References

External links

 http://www.post-gazette.com/ae/theater-dance/2010/04/01/Subway-is-a-platform-for-humanity-in-January-Feels-Like-Summer/stories/201004010361

1945 births
2013 deaths
People from Memphis, Tennessee
Male actors from Memphis, Tennessee
American male television actors
American male film actors
American male stage actors
American theatre directors